The siege of Magdeburg (French: Siège de Magdebourg) was a siege of the city that took place from 25 October to 8 November 1806 during the war of the Fourth Coalition. A French force, initially under the command of Marshal Grand Duke of Berg Joachim Murat, then a French army Corps under the command of Marshal Michel Ney laid siege and eventually obtained the surrender of Franz Kasimir von Kleist's Prussian force that had taken refuge in Magdeburg, Prussia's second city.

Siege
After the twin battles of Jena and Auerstaedt, the victorious Grande Armée pursued the remains of the Prussian army, a part of which was under the command of Prince Hohenlohe, who directed it towards the fortified city of Magdeburg. Commanding the French force, Marshal Murat requested Hohenlohe's surrender, which the Prince refused, managing to escape the besieged fortress. Command was delegated to General of Infantry Kleist, who still had a numerous garrison of 25,000 men. While the French force initially outnumbered the defenders, Emperor Napoleon I recalled the Army Corps of Marshal Jean-de-Dieu Soult, leaving Marshal Ney and his 18,000 men Corps to besiege the city. Occupying both banks of the Elbe, Ney did not display sufficient vigor during the siege, with military action reduced to a mere series of skirmishes and a timid sortie attempt by Kleist, on 4 November. Despite Kleist's initial attempt to bolster the fading morale of his troops by declaring that he would surrender Magdeburg to the enemy only when his handkerchief would ignite in his pocket, faced with the prospect of a full-scale bombardment, the Prussians decided to open negotiations and an armistice was concluded on November 7, with the garrison capitulating the next day and evacuating the fortress on 11 November as prisoners of war.

Notes

References

External links

Conflicts in 1806
Sieges of the Napoleonic Wars
Battles of the War of the Fourth Coalition
Sieges involving France
Sieges involving Prussia
Siege
1806 in Germany
1806 in Prussia
October 1806 events
November 1806 events
Battles in Saxony-Anhalt